Sikenica is a village and municipality in the Levice District in the Nitra Region of Slovakia.

History
In historical records the village was first mentioned in 1307.

Geography
The village lies at an altitude of 150 metres and covers an area of 25.549 km². It has a population of about 640 people.

Ethnicity
The village is approximately 58% Slovak, 40% Magyar, 1% Gypsy and 1% Czech.

Facilities
The village has a public library and football pitch.

External links
 
 
http://www.statistics.sk/mosmis/eng/run.html

Villages and municipalities in Levice District